Sama or SAMA may refer to:

Places 
 Sama, Burkina Faso, a town in the Kouka Department, Banwa Province, Burkina Faso
 Sama, China (Sanya), a city in Hainan, China
 Sama, Chalus, a village in Mazandaran Province, Iran
 Sama, Nowshahr, a village in Mazandaran Province, Iran
 Sama, South Khorasan, a village in Iran
 Sama (Harstad), a part of Harstad city in northern Norway
 Sama District, one of ten districts of Tacna province, Peru
 Sama, Asturias, a parish in the municipality of Langreo in northern Spain

People 
 Sama-Bajau, an ethnic group of the Philippines and Malaysia whose members commonly refer to themselves as Sama
 Sama (surname), a list of people

Arts and entertainment 
 Sama (film), a 1988 Tunisian film directed by Néjia Ben Mabrouk
 Sama (Dragana Mirković album), a 2000 studio album by Serbian singer Dragana Mirković
 Sama (Matthew Shipp and Sabir Mateen album), jazz album by Matthew Shipp and Sabir Mateen
 "Sama" (song), the Polish entry in the 1995 Eurovision Song Contest, performed by Justyna
 Sama, a character of the Mahabharata

Businesses 
 Saudi Central Bank, formerly Saudi Arabian Monetary Authority and still using the acronym SAMA, the central bank of Saudi Arabia
 Sama (airline), a defunct Saudi low-cost airline
 Sama (company), an artificial-intelligence company
 Sama Dubai, a property company based in Dubai
 Sama TV, a television station based in Damascus, Syria

Religion 
 Sama (Sufism), form of Sufi ritual ceremony
 Sama, the indigenous religion of the Munda people of India

SAMA 
 Liberation Organization of the People of Afghanistan, a Maoist insurgent group operating in Afghanistan
 San Antonio Museum of Art, an art museum in downtown San Antonio, Texas, USA
 Scottish Alternative Music Awards
 Saudi Arabian Monetary Authority, former name of the Saudi Central Bank, the central bank of Saudi Arabia which still uses the acronym SAMA
 Short-acting muscarinic antagonist, a group of medicines used in the treatment of chronic obstructive pulmonary disease
 South African Medical Association
 South African Music Awards, an annual award ceremony
 South African Musicians' Alliance, an artists' collective that resisted the strictures of apartheid
 South Atlantic Magnetic Anomaly, an area where the Earth's inner Van Allen radiation belt comes closest to the Earth's surface
 South Australian Mining Association, a company that in the late 19th century operated one of the world's largest copper mines
 Southern Alleghenies Museum of Art, an art museum with four locations in southwestern Pennsylvania, United States
 Student American Medical Association, a precursor of the American Medical Student Association

Other uses 
 , various motor ships
 Racing de Sama, a Spanish football club based in the parish of Sama, Langreo, Asturias
 Sama Beirut, an upcoming residential, commercial and office tower in the Sodeco region of Beirut, Lebanon
 Sama Tower, a skyscraper in Dubai, United Arab Emirates
 -sama (様), a Japanese honorific suffix
 Sama language, the language of the Sama people of Southeast Asia
 Sama language (Angola), a Bantu language of Angola

See also
 Samma tribe, a Rajput tribe in Pakistan and India

Language and nationality disambiguation pages